Peter Hardeman Burnett (November 15, 1807May 17, 1895) was an American politician who served as the first elected Governor of California from December 20, 1849, to January 9, 1851. Burnett was elected Governor almost one year before California's admission to the Union as the 31st state in September 1850.

Raised in a slave-owning family in Missouri, Burnett moved westward after his career in business left him heavily in debt. Initially residing in Oregon Country, he became Supreme Judge of the Provisional Government of Oregon. While in Oregon politics, he pushed for the total exclusion of African-Americans from the territory. He authored the infamous "Burnett's lash law" that authorized the flogging of any free blacks who refused to leave Oregon; the law was deemed "unduly harsh" and went unenforced prior to voters rescinding it in 1845.

In 1848, Burnett moved to California during the height of the California Gold Rush. He re-established his political career and was appointed to serve on the Supreme Court of California. In this capacity, Burnett ordered the infamous extradition of Archy Lee, a formerly enslaved man living in Sacramento, back to Mississippi. Though Burnett himself had enslaved two people, he opposed calls to make California a slave state, instead pushing for the total exclusion of African-Americans in California.

As Governor, Burnett signed into law the so-called Act for the Government and Protection of Indians, which enabled the enslavement of Native Californians and contributed to their genocide. He declared in an 1851 speech "[t]hat a war of extermination will continue to be waged between the races until the Indian race becomes extinct must be expected. While we cannot anticipate the result with but painful regret, the inevitable destiny of the race is beyond the power and wisdom of man to avert." Efforts by federal negotiators to preserve some Native land rights were fought by the administration of Burnett, who favored the elimination of California's indigenous peoples. Furthermore, Burnett is noted for being an early proponent of the exclusion of Chinese immigrant laborers from California, and following his governorship would advocate for the federal Chinese Exclusion Act.

Early life and career

Burnett was born in Nashville, Tennessee, but raised in rural Missouri. He was raised in a family of slave owners, later enslaving two of his own. In 1828, he married Harriet Rogers.

Burnett never received any formal education aside from elementary school, but educated himself in law and government. After owning a general store, he turned to his law career. Defending a group of Mormons—including Joseph Smith—who were accused of treason, arson and robbery, Burnett requested a change of venue for the court proceedings. During transportation to the next venue, the defendants escaped.

Political career in Oregon

In 1843, having failed as a merchant and heavily in debt, Burnett became part of the exodus of Easterners moving westward, moving his family from Barry, Missouri to Oregon Country (now modern-day Oregon) to take up farming in order to solve growing debts in Missouri, an agricultural endeavor that failed. While in Oregon Country, Burnett began his forays into politics, getting elected to the provisional legislature between 1844 and 1848. In 1844, he completed construction of Germantown Road between the Tualatin Valley and what became Portland. It was during his time in Oregon that Burnett, a traditional Southern Protestant, began to question the practices of his faith, his religious views drifting more to Roman Catholicism. By 1846, Burnett and his family made the complete transition from Protestant to become Catholic.

While in the Legislature, and later as Provisional Supreme Judge, Burnett signed Oregon's first exclusion laws. Under an 1844 law passed by the provisional government—just after the same government abolished slavery—slave holders could keep their slaves for up to three years, after which all black people, free or slave, had to leave Oregon Country or face flogging.

Move to California 
Upon news of the discovery of gold in Coloma, California on January 24, 1848, Burnett and his family moved south to participate in the rush. After modest success in getting gold, Burnett envisioned a career in law in San Francisco, a rapidly growing boomtown thanks largely to the Gold Rush. On the way to the Bay Area, Burnett met John Augustus Sutter, Jr., son of German-born Swiss pioneer John Sutter. Selling his father's deeded lands in the near vicinity of Sutter's Fort, the younger Sutter offered Burnett a job in selling land plots for the new town of Sacramento. Over the next year, Burnett made nearly US$50,000 in land sales in Sacramento, a city ideally suited due to its closeness to the Sierra Nevada and the neighboring Sacramento River's navigability for large ships.

In 1848, Burnett was among those who founded the city of Oregon City in Butte County, California.

Governorship of California

In 1849, Burnett announced his intentions to return to politics. 1849 saw the first California Constitutional Convention in Monterey, where territorial politicians drafted documents suitable to admit California as a state in the United States. During the 1849 referendum to adopt the California Constitution, Burnett, now with name recognition in Sacramento and San Francisco, and a resume that included the Oregon Provisional Legislature, decided to run for the new territory's first civilian governor, replacing the string of military governors and bureaucracy from the U.S. military. Burnett easily won the election over four other candidates, including John Sutter, and was sworn in as California's first elected civilian governor on December 20, 1849, in San Jose in front of what would soon (after statehood in 1850) become the California State Legislature.

The Burnett Administration
In the first days of the Burnett Administration, the governor and the California Legislature set out to create the organs of a state government, creating state cabinet posts, archives, executive posts and departments, subdividing the state into 27 counties and appointing John C. Fremont and William M. Gwin as California's senators to the federal U.S. Senate. Despite home proclamations and bureaucratic reorganizations that recognized California now as a U.S. state, the U.S. Congress and President Zachary Taylor had in fact not even signed authorization of statehood for California. Part of this miscommunication was due to California's relative remoteness to the rest of the U.S. during the time, but also to over-enthusiastic attitudes by politicians and the public alike to get California into the Union as quickly as possible. Following long contentious debates in the U.S. Senate, California was admitted as a (non-slave) state on September 9, 1850, as part of the Compromise of 1850. Californians did not learn of their official statehood until one month later, when on October 18, the steamer Oregon entered San Francisco Bay, with a banner strapped to her rigging reading "California Is a State".

During those advancements into statehood, Burnett's popularity among the legislature, the press, and the public plummeted. Relations between the Legislature and Burnett began to immediately sour in early 1850, when bills pressing for the incorporation of Sacramento and Los Angeles as city municipalities, with Los Angeles being a special incorporation due to its earlier pueblo status during the previous Spanish and Mexican rule, passed the State Assembly and Senate. Burnett vetoed both bills, citing special incorporation bills as unconstitutional and that reviews for municipal incorporation were best left to county courts. The legislature failed to override Burnett's veto of the Los Angeles bill but succeeded in overriding the Sacramento bill making it California's first incorporated city.

For California's legal system, Burnett recommended to the first session of the state legislature that California should implement a hybrid legal system mixing significant elements of both civil law and common law.  He advocated for enacting California versions of the Louisiana Civil Code and the Louisiana Code of Practice (Louisiana's name for what Americans would call a code of civil procedure), and adopting American common law for crimes, evidence, and commercial law.  This touched off an uproar among the American lawyers who had flocked to California, with the majority pushing for common law and a minority (led by John W. Dwinelle) advocating adoption of civil law.  The Senate Judiciary Committee, chaired by Elisha Oscar Crosby, published a report in February 1850 recommending adoption of the common law through the enactment of a reception statute; Burnett signed the resulting bill into law on April 13, 1850.

Characterized as an aloof politician with little support from the Legislature by the San Francisco, Sacramento and Los Angeles press, Burnett grew frustrated as his agenda ground to a halt, and his governance style was increasingly criticized. He became a regular fixture of ridicule in the state's newspapers and on the floor of the Legislature. With little over a year in office, Burnett, the first governor of the state, became the first to resign, announcing his resignation in January 1851. Burnett cited personal matters for his departure. Lieutenant Governor John McDougall replaced Burnett as the Governor of California on 9 January.

His policies

As in Oregon, Burnett pushed for the exclusion of blacks from California, raising the ire of pro-slavery supporters who wanted to import the Southern slave system to the West Coast, but his proposals were defeated in the legislature. From Burnett's First Annual Message to the Legislature, December 21, 1849:

Similarly, Burnett also pushed for heavy taxation on foreign immigrants. An 1850 Foreign Miners Tax Act, signed into law by Burnett, required every miner of non-American origin to pay US$20. Burnett also argued heavily for increased taxation and for the expansion of capital punishment to include larceny. Burnett also attempted to remove Native Americans as well as foreign miners. In 1851, federal commissioners negotiated treaties with Native tribes in California, which were then blocked by the governor for being too generous in reserving land for the tribes. Instead, the greed for gold wealth led to a second option, with Burnett declaring "t]hat a war of extermination will continue to be waged between the races until the Indian race becomes extinct must be expected. While we cannot anticipate the result with but painful regret, the inevitable destiny of the race is beyond the power and wisdom of man to avert."

Post-governorship
One year after leaving the governorship, Burnett was finally able to repay the heavy debts he had incurred in Missouri nearly two decades before. He entered a number of careers, serving briefly as a justice in the California Supreme Court between 1857 and 1858, the Sacramento City Council, as well as becoming a San Jose-based lawyer, a noted proponent of Catholicism during the Victorian period, and then the president of the Pacific Bank of San Francisco. Although never venturing into politics much after the 1860s, Burnett was an active supporter of the federal Chinese Exclusion Act of 1882. In 1880, he published an autobiography, Recollections and Opinions of an Old Pioneer. He died May 17, 1895, at the age of 87 in San Francisco, and is buried in the Santa Clara Mission Cemetery at Santa Clara, California.

Legacy
Burnett's legacy is largely mixed. While regarded as one of the fathers of modern California in the state's early days, his racist attitudes towards black, Chinese, and Native American people have tarnished his name today. Burnett's period in the Oregon Provisional Legislature helped facilitate the exclusion of black people from the state until 1926. In 1844, one of his Oregon proposals was to force free black people to leave the state and to institute floggings of any who continued to remain. Referred to as "Burnett's lash law", it was deemed "unduly harsh", and it was never enforced, voters rescinding it in 1845. Also, his open hostility to foreign laborers influenced a number of federal and state California legislators to push future xenophobic legislation, such as the Chinese Exclusion Act, 30 years after his departure from the governorship. Burnett was also an open advocate of exterminating local California Indian tribes, a policy that continued with successive state governmental administrations for several decades, which offered US$10 to US$25 for evidence of dead Natives. From Burnett's Second Annual Message to the Legislature, January 7, 1851:

San Francisco's Burnett Avenue near the Haight-Ashbury neighborhood is named after him.

The Burnett Child Development Center, a preschool in a predominantly black San Francisco neighborhood, had been named for Burnett. However, when Burnett's racist positions were rediscovered, the school was renamed in 2011 to the Leola M. Havard Early Education School, in honor of San Francisco's first African-American principal.

Similarly, the Peter H. Burnett Elementary School in Long Beach has been recently renamed, due to Burnett's views. It is now named after Bobbi Smith, the first African-American member of the Long Beach Unified School District's board.

In 2019, Peter Burnett Middle School in San Jose was renamed Muwekma Ohlone Middle School in honor of the original inhabitants of that area.

In July 2020, Peter Burnett Elementary School in Hawthorne was renamed to 138th Street Elementary School.

References

External links
 Peter Hardeman Burnett at the Roman Catholic Encyclopedia
 Peter Burnett biography at the California State Library
 Guide to the Peter H. Burnett Papers at The Bancroft Library
 He wrote this book in 1860 and can be read for free at Google Books  The path which led a Protestant lawyer to the Catholic Church
 Peter H. Burnett. California Supreme Court Historical Society. Retrieved July 18, 2017.
 Past & Present Justices. California State Courts. Retrieved July 19, 2017.
 Recollections and opinions of an old pioneer (1880), by Peter Hardeman Burnett. Digitized at Library of Congress. Retrieved April 13, 2019.

1807 births
1895 deaths
Politicians from Nashville, Tennessee
Writers from Nashville, Tennessee
Catholics from Tennessee
Converts to Roman Catholicism from Baptist denominations
Democratic Party governors of California
Sacramento City Council members
Justices of the Supreme Court of California
California pioneers
California genocide
People of the California Gold Rush
Oregon pioneers
Justices of the Oregon Supreme Court
U.S. state supreme court judges admitted to the practice of law by reading law
Members of the Provisional Government of Oregon
Burials at Mission Santa Clara de Asís
19th-century American judges
American slave owners